Dramane Traoré (born 17 June 1982) is a Malian former professional footballer who played as a striker. He made 30 appearances scoring 7 goals for the Mali national team.

International career 
Traoré was a regular for the Mali national team. He was part of Mali's 2004 Olympic football team, which exited in the quarter finals, finishing top of group A, but losing to Italy in the next round. In 2007, he scored a last minute winner against Togo in the Africa Cup of Nations 2008 qualifier.

Honours

Club
Lokomotiv Moscow
Russian Cup: 2006–07

Espérance de Tunis
 Tunisian Ligue Professionnelle 1: 2010–11
 Tunisian Cup: 2010–11

Individual
 Malaysia Super League Golden Boots Award: 2015

References

External links 
 

1982 births
Living people
Sportspeople from Bamako
Malian footballers
Association football forwards
Mali international footballers
Footballers at the 2004 Summer Olympics
Olympic footballers of Mali
2004 African Cup of Nations players
2008 Africa Cup of Nations players
Stade Malien players
Djoliba AC players
Club Africain players
FC Lokomotiv Moscow players
FC Kuban Krasnodar players
Espérance Sportive de Tunis players
Dubai CSC players
FC Metalurh Donetsk players
Russian Premier League players
Ukrainian Premier League players
UAE Pro League players
Malian expatriate footballers
Malian expatriates in Russia
Expatriate footballers in Russia
Malian expatriate sportspeople in Tunisia
Expatriate footballers in Tunisia
Malian expatriate sportspeople in Egypt
Expatriate footballers in Egypt
Expatriate footballers in Ukraine
Malian expatriate sportspeople in the United Arab Emirates
Expatriate footballers in the United Arab Emirates
21st-century Malian people